Ben Sira also known as Shimon ben Yeshua ben Eliezer ben Sira (Hebrew: שמעון בן יהושע בן אליעזר בן סירא) or Yeshua Ben Sirach, was a Hellenistic Jewish scribe, sage, and allegorist from Seleucid-controlled Jerusalem of the Second Temple period. He is the author of Sirach, also known as the "Book of Ecclesiasticus".

He wrote his work in Hebrew, possibly in Alexandria in Egypt in the Ptolemaic Kingdom c. 180–175 BCE, where he is thought to have established a school.

While Ben Sira is sometimes claimed to be a contemporary of Simeon the Just, it is more likely that his contemporary was High Priest Simon II (219–199 BCE) and this is due to confusion with his father, Yeshua'.

A medieval text, the Alphabet of Sirach, was falsely attributed to him.

Name

In the Koine Greek text of the Book of Sirach, the author's father is called "Jesus the son of Sirach of Jerusalem". Jesus is the Anglicized form of the Greek name Ἰησοῦς, the equivalent of the Aramaic borrowed from late Biblical Hebrew Yeshuaʽ, derived from the older Masoretic Hebrew Yehoshuaʽ.

The copy owned by Saadia Gaon, the prominent rabbi, Jewish philosopher, and exegete of the 10th century, had the reading "Shimʽon, son of Yeshuaʽ, son of Elʽazar ben Siraʼ"; and a similar reading occurs in the Hebrew manuscript B.

Sirach is the Greek form of the family name Sira. It adds the letter Chi, an addition like that in Hakel-dama-ch in Acts 1:19.

Legend
According to a Jewish legend, Ben Sira was born to the daughter of the prophet Jeremiah, after she entered a hot bath soon after her father had left it, and there received her father's seed. The son of this conception was named Ben Zera', "son of seed," but when he grew older and came to understand the significance of his name he was ashamed of it and changed it to Ben Sira.

Life

According to the Greek version, though not according to the Syriac, the author traveled extensively (xxxiv. 11) and was frequently in danger of death (xxxiv. verse 12). In the hymn of chapter li, he speaks of the perils of all sorts from which God had delivered him, although this is probably only a poetic theme in imitation of the Psalms. The calumnies to which he was exposed in the presence of a certain king, supposed to be one of the Ptolemaic dynasty, are mentioned only in the Greek version, being ignored both in the Syriac and in the Hebrew text. The only fact known with certainty, drawn from the text itself, is that Ben Sira was a scholar, and a scribe thoroughly versed in the Law, and especially in the "Books of Wisdom."

Grandson
Very little is known about his grandson, who claims in the text to be the translator of Sirach into Greek. He probably did the translation many years later after the original was written.

The Prologue in the Greek text, attributed to him, is generally considered the earliest witness to a canon of the books of the prophets.

The grandson states that he came to Egypt in the thirty-eighth year of the reign of Euergetes. Ptolemy VIII Physcon must be intended; he ascended the throne in 170 BCE, together with his brother Philometor, but he soon became sole ruler of Cyrene, and from 146 to 117 BCE, held sway over all Egypt. He dated his reign from the year in which he received the crown (i.e., from 170 BCE). The translator must therefore have gone to Egypt in 132 BCE.

See also
 Wisdom literature
 Wisdom (personification)

References

External links
 BenSira.org – ancient and medieval Hebrew manuscripts of the book of Ben Sira
 The Book of Sirach (or Ecclesiasticus)
 

Hebrew-language writers
2nd-century BC people
Year of birth missing
Year of death unknown
People in the deuterocanonical books
Ptolemaic Jews